John T. Dugan (October 11, 1920 – December 24, 1994) was an American screenwriter. He wrote for television programs, including Bonanza, Mr. Novak, 12 O'Clock High, Dr. Kildare, Adam-12, Star Trek: The Original Series, Ben Casey, Mission: Impossible, Columbo and Little House on the Prairie. Dugan died in December 1994 of pancreatic cancer at his home in Encino, California, at the age of 74.

References

External links 

1920 births
1994 deaths
People from New York (state)
Deaths from pancreatic cancer
Deaths from cancer in California
Screenwriters from New York (state)
American male screenwriters
American television writers
American male television writers
20th-century American screenwriters
20th-century American male writers
Fordham University alumni
Catholic University of America alumni
University of Minnesota alumni